Edward Coates may refer to:

 Sir Edward Coates, 1st Baronet (1853–1921), British stockbroker and MP for Lewisham
 Edward Coates (pirate) (fl. 1690s), colonial American privateer in English service
 Edward Hornor Coates (1846–1921), Philadelphia businessman who commissioned The Swimming Hole

Edward Coates may also refer to:

 Édouard Cortès (1882–1969), French post-Impressionist painter